This is a list of football clubs in Libya.
For a complete list see :Category:Football clubs in Libya

A
Alakhdhar S.C.
Al Andalus Tobruk
Al Ansar Club (Libya)
Al Dhahra Bani Walid
Al Harati Khums
Al Ittihad Gheryan
Al Sawa'ed
Al Ta'awon
Attersana S.C.
Al Urouba (Ajelat)
Al-Ahly SC (Benghazi)
Al-Ahly SC (Tripoli)
Al-Mustaqbal (football club)
Alamn Alaam
Alhiyad Sports Club
Aljazeera Sports Club
Annajma S.C.
Asswehly S.C.
Al Charara

D
Darnes Sports Club
Dhahra
Alitthad, Tripoli 1944

H
Hilal SC

I
Ittihad Club

K
Khaleej Sirte S.C.

N
Al-Nasr SC (Benghazi)
Nojom Ajdabiya
Nojoom Al Baazah

O
Olympic Azzaweya S.C.

R
Rafik Sorman

S
Shabaab al Jabal
Al-Shat S.C.
Al Soukour

T
Tahaddy Benghazi

W
Al-Wahda SC (Tripoli)

 
Libya
Football clubs
Football clubs